The Big Tree of Bunlahy: Stories of My Own Countryside is a children's short story collection by Padraic Colum. It contains thirteen stories based on the tales told to the author in his home town of Bunlahy in County Longford, Ireland. The first edition was illustrated by Jack Yeats.  The collection was first published in 1933 by Macmillan and was a Newbery Honor recipient in 1934.

References

1933 short story collections
American children's books
Children's short story collections
Newbery Honor-winning works
1933 children's books